Carroll C. Hollensworth (January 6, 1900 – May 19, 1959) was an American politician. He was a member of the Arkansas House of Representatives, serving from 1941 to 1942, from 1947 to 1950, and from 1953 to 1955. He was a member of the Democratic party.

He was married to the former Mayme Bird Stevens who was born in Arkansas in 1908 and died in Suffolk County, New York in 1994. He is the father of Judith H Hope, who was the Supervisor of the Town of East Hampton and the former Chairperson of the New York State Democratic Party.

References

1959 deaths
1900 births
People from Bradley County, Arkansas
20th-century American politicians
Speakers of the Arkansas House of Representatives
Democratic Party members of the Arkansas House of Representatives